Lifehacker is a weblog about life hacks and software that launched on January 31, 2005. The site was originally launched by Gawker Media and is currently owned by G/O Media. The blog posts cover a wide range of topics including: Microsoft Windows, Mac, Linux programs, iOS and Android, as well as general life tips and tricks. The website is known for its fast-paced release schedule from its inception, with content being published every half hour all day long.

In addition, Lifehacker has international editions: Lifehacker Australia ( owned by Pedestrian), Lifehacker Japan, and Lifehacker UK, which feature most posts from the U.S. edition along with extra content specific to local readers. Lifehacker UK folded on September 9, 2020 when its UK publisher decided not to renew its license.

History
Gina Trapani founded Lifehacker and was the site's sole blogger until September 2005, when two associate editors joined her, Erica Sadun and D. Keith Robinson. Other former associate editors include Wendy Boswell, Rick Broida, Jason Fitzpatrick, Kevin Purdy, and Jackson West. Former contributing editors include The How-To Geek, and Tamar Weinberg.

Lifehacker launched in January 2005 with an exclusive sponsorship by Sony. The highly publicized ad campaign was rumored to have cost $75,000 for three months. Since then, a variety of tech-oriented advertisers have appeared on the site.

Lifehackers frequent guest posts have included articles by Joe Anderson, Eszter Hargittai, Matt Haughey, Meg Hourihan, Jeff Jarvis.

On January 16, 2009, Trapani resigned as Lifehackers lead editor and Adam Pash assumed the position.

On February 7, 2011, Lifehacker revealed a redesigned site with a cleaner layout. Then, on April 15, 2013, Lifehacker redesigned their site again to match the other newly redesigned Gawker sites, like Kotaku.

On January 7, 2013, Adam Pash moved on from Lifehacker to a new start-up, and Whitson Gordon became the new editor-in-chief.

On January 1, 2016, Whitson Gordon parted ways with Lifehacker to another popular technology website, How-To Geek, as their editor-in-chief replacing Lowell Heddings. In his announcement, Gordon confirmed that Alan Henry would take over as the interim editor pending interviewing processes. Alan Henry became the new editor-in-chief on February 1, 2016.

On February 3, 2017, Alan Henry left his position at Lifehacker. He has since moved on to write for the New York Times.

On February 28, 2017, Melissa Kirsch became the editor-in-chief. Alice Bradley was named editor-in-chief in June 2020, but left in March 2021. Former deputy editor Jordan Calhoun succeeded her as editor-in-chief.

Lifehacker was one of six websites that was purchased by Univision Communications in their acquisition of Gawker Media in August 2016.

Accolades
In 2005, TIME named Lifehacker one of the "50 Coolest Web Sites" in 2005, one of the "25 Sites We Can't Live Without" in 2006 and one of the "25 Best Blogs 2009"
CNET named Lifehacker in their "Blog 100" in October 2005.
Wired presented Gina Trapani with a Rave Award in 2006 for Best Blog.
In the 2007 Weblog Awards, Lifehacker was awarded Best Group Weblog.
PC Magazine named Lifehacker in "Our Favorite 100 Blogs" in October 2007.
US Mensa named Lifehacker as one of their top 50 sites in 2010.

References

Further reading

External links

 
International
 Lifehacker Australia
 Lifehacker Japan

Gawker Media
American blogs
Internet properties established in 2005
Former Univision Communications subsidiaries